Itunu is a name. It can refer to:

Aldora Itunu (born 1991), New Zealand rugby union player
Itunu Hotonu (born 1959), Nigerian naval officer
Linda Itunu (born 1984), New Zealand rugby union player